Lakshan Somaweera (born 1 May 1996) is a Sri Lankan cricketer. He made his first-class debut for Galle Cricket Club in Tier B of the 2016–17 Premier League Tournament Tier on 16 December 2016.

References

External links
 

1996 births
Living people
Sri Lankan cricketers
Kurunegala Youth Cricket Club cricketers
People from Kurunegala